The Meir Taweig Synagogue is the only synagogue still active in Baghdad, Iraq. Today, a small group of Jews looks after the synagogue. The synagogue is located in Al-Bataween district in eastern Baghdad.

See also
 History of the Jews in Iraq

References

Edot HaMizrach
Jews and Judaism in Baghdad
Orthodox synagogues
Synagogues in Iraq
Buildings and structures in Baghdad
Religious buildings and structures in Baghdad
Sephardi Jewish culture in Asia
Sephardi synagogues